This is a partial list of Jupiter's  trojan asteroids (60° behind Jupiter) with numbers 600001–700000 .

600001–700000 

This list contains 28 objects sorted in numerical order.

top

References 
 

 Trojan_6
Jupiter Trojans (Trojan Camp)
Lists of Jupiter trojans